Sengo may be,

Sengo language
Mose Se Sengo, guitarist
Sengo Muramasa, swordsmith